The Sebeș (also: Seviș, in its upper course also: Șteaza) is a right tributary of the river Cibin in Romania. Its source is in the Cindrel Mountains. It discharges into the Cibin in Șelimbăr, southeast of Sibiu.

Tributaries
The following rivers are tributaries to the river Sebeș (from source to mouth):

Left: -

Right: Șanta, Valea Ploscarilor, Strâmba, Valea Caselor, Valea Stupului

References

Rivers of Romania
Rivers of Sibiu County